The Outer Banks (frequently abbreviated OBX) are a  string of barrier islands and spits off the coast of North Carolina and southeastern Virginia, on the east coast of the United States. They line most of the North Carolina coastline, separating Currituck Sound, Albemarle Sound, and Pamlico Sound from the Atlantic Ocean. A major tourist destination, the Outer Banks are known for their wide expanse of open beachfront and the Cape Hatteras National Seashore. The seashore and surrounding ecosystem are important biodiversity zones, including beach grasses and shrubland that help maintain the form of the land.

The Outer Banks were sites of early European settlement in the United States and remain important economic and cultural sites. Most notably the English Roanoke Colony vanished from Roanoke Island in 1587 and was the first location where an English person, Virginia Dare, was born in the Americas. The hundreds of shipwrecks along the Outer Banks have given the surrounding seas the nickname Graveyard of the Atlantic. The Outer Banks were also home to the Wright brothers' first flight in a controlled, powered, heavier-than-air vehicle on December 17, 1903, at Kill Devil Hills. During the 20th century the region became increasingly important for coastal tourism.

The Outer Banks are particularly vulnerable to sea level rise and coastal erosion; the effects of climate change compounds existing coastal erosion caused by poor coastal management and construction practices. In some locations on the banks, sea levels rose 5 inches from 2011 to 2015. Some sections have significantly eroded already, with portions of Hatteras Island at 25% of its original width as of 2014. Tropical storms like Hurricane Irene in 2011 have already destroyed significant infrastructure and property.

Terminology
The term "Outer Banks" refers to the islands, shoals, and spits from Cape Lookout northward, including Core Banks, and is frequently abbreviated OBX on regional tourism marketing. In recent decades, the beaches to the south of Cape Lookout have been marketing themselves as the "Southern Outer Banks", including the marketing as SOBX; this region includes the Crystal Coast beaches of Bogue Banks. The term Inner Banks and IBX is a similarly new term to refer to the mainland communities along Albemarle and Pamlico Sounds.

Geography

The Outer Banks is a string of peninsulas and barrier islands separating the Atlantic Ocean from mainland North Carolina. From north to south, the largest of these include: Bodie Island (which used to be an island but is now a peninsula due to tropical storms and hurricanes that closed inlets that separated it from the Currituck Banks), Pea Island (which has, at times, been contiguous with neighboring Bodie Island or Hatteras Island), Hatteras Island, Ocracoke Island, Portsmouth Island, and the Core Banks. Over time, the exact number of islands and inlets changes as new inlets are opened up, often during a breach created during violent storms, and older inlets close, usually due to gradually shifting sands during the dynamic processes of beach evolution.

The Outer Banks stretch southward from Sandbridge in Virginia Beach down the North Carolina coastline. Sources differ regarding the southern terminus of the Outer Banks. The most extensive definition includes the state's three prominent capes: Cape Hatteras, Cape Lookout, and Cape Fear. Other sources limit the definition to two capes (Cape Hatteras and Cape Lookout) and coastal areas in four counties (Currituck County, Dare County, Hyde County, and Carteret County). Some authors exclude Carteret's Bogue Banks; others exclude the county entirely.

The northern part of the Outer Banks, from Oregon Inlet northward, is actually a part of the North American mainland, since the northern inlets of Bodie Island and Currituck Banks no longer exist. It is separated by the Currituck Sound and the Intracoastal Waterway, which passes through the Great Dismal Swamp occupying much of the mainland west of the Outer Banks. Road access to the northern Outer Banks is cut off between Sandbridge and Corolla, North Carolina, with communities such as Carova Beach accessible only by four-wheel drive vehicles. North Carolina State Highway 12 links most of the popular Outer Banks communities in this section of the coast. The easternmost point is Rodanthe Pier in Rodanthe, NC .

The Outer Banks are not anchored to offshore coral reefs like some other barrier islands, and as a consequence, they often suffer significant beach erosion during major storms. In fact, their location jutting out into the Atlantic makes them the most hurricane-prone area north of Florida, for both landfalling storms and brushing storms offshore. Hatteras Island was cut in half on September 18, 2003, when Hurricane Isabel washed a 2,000 feet (600 m) wide and 15 feet (5 m) deep channel called Isabel Inlet through the community of Hatteras Village on the southern end of the island. The tear was subsequently repaired and restored by sand dredging by the U.S. Army Corps of Engineers. It was cut off once again in 2011 by Hurricane Irene. Access to the island was largely limited to boat access only from August to late October until another temporary bridge could be built.

Three state highway bridges connect the Outer Banks to the mainland, the Wright Memorial Bridge, the oldest (built in 1930, rehabilitated in 1966), carries US 158 between Point Harbor and Kitty Hawk. William B. Umstead Bridge, the second oldest (built in 1957, rehabilitated in 1966), carries US 64 between Manns Harbor on the mainland and Manteo on Roanoke Island. The newest bridge, the Virginia Dare Memorial Bridge, was completed in 2002 and carries US 64 Bypass between Manns Harbor and Roanoke Island between Manteo and Wanchese. The Melvin R. Daniels Bridge carries US 64 between Roanoke Island and Nags Head. At Whalebone Junction, the three main highways of the Outer Banks (NC 12, US 158, and US 64) all meet. Additionally, NC 615 serves as the main route along Knotts Island in the extreme north; it connects only to Virginia by land.

A number of ferries maintained by the North Carolina Department of Transportation Ferry Division also serve the Outer Banks. From north to south, these are the Knotts Island-Currituck Ferry, the Hatteras-Ocracoke Ferry, the Swan Quarter-Ocracoke Ferry, and the Cedar Island-Ocracoke Ferry. Additionally, a semi-regular emergency ferry often runs from Stumpy Point to Rodanthe to serve travelers due to frequent wash-outs of NC 12 between Nags Head and Rodanthe. Additionally, private ferries are commissioned by the National Park Service to access certain islands within the National Seashores along the outer banks, these include ferries to Portsmouth Island, to Cape Lookout Lighthouse, and various locations along Core Banks and Shackleford Banks.

Ecology

Vegetation
The vegetation of the Outer Banks has biodiversity, although it is considered the northern limit for many southern plants such as wild scrub palms. In the northern part of the Outer Banks, from Virginia Beach southward past the North Carolina border to Cape Hatteras, the main types of vegetation are sea grasses, beach grasses and other beach plants including Opuntia humifusa on the Atlantic side and wax myrtles, bays, and grasses on the Sound side with areas of pine and Spanish moss-covered live oaks. Yucca aloifolia and Yucca gloriosa can be found growing wild here in the northern parts of its range on the beach. Dwarf palmettos were once indigenous to the entire Outer Banks, and they are still successfully planted and grown. Its current most northerly known native stand is on Monkey Island in Currituck County.

From Cape Hatteras National Seashore southward, the vegetation does include dwarf palmetto (Sabal minor), Yucca aloifolia and Yucca gloriosa; however, the area also has Cabbage palmetto (Sabal palmetto), which can be found in the north, although they are native in the southern part of the Outer Banks, specifically prevalent from Cape Hatteras and all points southward. Pindo palms and windmill palms are also planted widely throughout the Outer Banks; although, they are not indigenous to the area.

A wide variety of native plants can be found at the Elizabethan Gardens in Manteo on Roanoke Island.

The Outer Banks are home to Yaupon Holly (Ilex vomitoria), the roasted leaves of which were brewed into a high caffeine beverage called black drink by the Native Americans. The Outer Banks may be one of the few places where it is still consumed.

Animal life
The islands are home to herds of feral horses, sometimes called "banker ponies", which according to local legend are descended from Spanish mustangs washed ashore centuries ago in shipwrecks. Populations are found on Ocracoke Island, Shackleford Banks, Currituck Banks, and in the Rachel Carson Estuarine Sanctuary.

Climate
The Outer Banks has a humid subtropical climate (Cfa). The outer banks have unusual weather patterns because of their unique geographical location. As the islands jut out from the eastern seaboard into the Atlantic Gulf Stream, the Outer Banks has a predisposition to be affected by hurricanes, Nor'easters (usually in the form of rain, and rarely snow or mixed precipitation), and other ocean-driven storms. The hardiness zone is 8b.

The winters are typically milder than in inland areas, averaging lows in the upper 30s and highs in the lower 50s, and are more frequently overcast than in the summer. However, the exposure of the Outer Banks makes them prone to higher winds, often causing wind chills to make the apparent temperature as cold as the inland areas. The summer months average lows from the mid-70s to highs in the upper 80s, depending on the time of the summer. The spring and fall are typically milder seasons. The fall and winter are usually warmer than areas inland, while the spring and the summer are often slightly cooler because of the moderating effects of being surrounded by water.

Although snow is possible, averaging from 3 inches in the north to less than 1/2 inch per year in the south, there are many times when years pass between snowfalls. The majority of nor'easters are "born" off the coasts of the Outer Banks.

The Outer Banks are particularly vulnerable to sea level rise and coastal erosion; the effects of climate change compounds existing coastal erosion caused by poor coastal management and construction practices. In some locations on the banks, sea levels rose 5 inches from 2011 to 2015. Some sections have significantly eroded already, with portions of Hatteras Island at 25% of its original width as of 2014. Tropical storms like Hurricane Irene in 2011 have already destroyed significant infrastructure and property.

History

The Outer Banks is one of the most culturally distinctive areas of the East Coast of the United States. The Outer Banks were inhabited before the arrival of Europeans, with small branches of larger tribes, such as the Algonquin speaking Chowanoke, Secotan and Poteskeet living semi-nomadic lives. Oftentimes Native Americans would use the barrier islands facing the Atlantic Ocean for fishing in the summer, and reside on Roanoke Island or the North Carolina mainland in the winter.

European explorers to the Outer Banks as far back as the 1500s noted encountering the friendly Hatteras Island and Outer Banks Natives, noting their hospitality to foreign explorers as well as their happiness and overall quality of life. European-borne diseases and migration to the mainland were likely the main causes for the decline of the Native population. The most notable event was the attempted colonization of Roanoke by the English beginning in 1584.

Before bridges were built in the 1930s, the only form of transport between or off the islands was by boat, which allowed for the islands to stay isolated from much of the rest of the mainland. This helped to preserve the maritime culture and the distinctive Outer Banks accent or brogue, which sounds more like an English accent than it does an American accent. Many "bankers" have often been mistaken for being from England or Ireland when traveling to areas outside of the Outer Banks. The brogue is more distinctive the further south one travels on the Outer Banks, with it being the thickest on Ocracoke Island and Harkers Island.

Some residents of the Outer Banks, known as wreckers, made part of their living by scavenging wrecked ships—or by luring ships to their destruction. Horses with lanterns tied to their necks would be walked along the beach; the lanterns' up and down motion would appear to ships to represent clear water and a ship ahead; the unsuspecting captain would then drive his ship ashore following this false light. Ocracoke was the last refuge of pirate Edward Teach, better known as Blackbeard. It is also where the infamous pirate was killed November 22, 1718, in a fierce battle with troops from Virginia.

Economy
Major industries of the region include commercial fishing, boat building and tourism. Since the 1990s, the rise of tourism has led the region to become an increasingly service-oriented economy.

Maritime industries
There has been a long history of fishing in the Outer Banks, dating back to the end of the 17th century. Pirates ravaged the coast for the majority of the 1600s, but once they were ridden, the local settlers used fishing as their lifeline.

In the mid-19th century, large-scale commercial fishing erupted, mostly due to the construction of the Albemarle and Chesapeake Canal, which simplified shipping methods for fishermen. Saltwater fishing became the cash-crop of the Outer Banks, and blossomed it into a popular tourist destination. In modern times, tourists will flock to the area just for the abundance of fishing opportunities. Anglers, otherwise known as fishermen, have a wide range of fishing methods, some dating back to when the first settlers arrived, to choose from in the Outer Banks.

Lighthouses
There are currently six lighthouses on the Outer Banks
Currituck Beach Lighthouse, located in Corolla, North Carolina
Roanoke Marshes Light, located in Manteo, North Carolina
Bodie Island Lighthouse, located south of Nags Head, North Carolina
Cape Hatteras Lighthouse, located in Buxton, North Carolina
Ocracoke Light, located in Ocracoke, North Carolina
Cape Lookout Lighthouse, located in Carteret County, North Carolina

Communities
Towns and communities along the Outer Banks include (listed from north to south):

Currituck Banks
Sandbridge (VA)
Carova Beach
Corolla
Knotts Island

Bodie Island

Duck
Southern Shores
Kitty Hawk
Kill Devil Hills
Nags Head

Roanoke Island
Manteo
Wanchese

Hatteras Island

Rodanthe
Waves
Salvo
Avon
Buxton
Frisco
Hatteras

Ocracoke Island
Ocracoke

Core Banks
Portsmouth Island

Bogue Banks
Atlantic Beach
Pine Knoll Shores
Indian Beach
Salter Path
Emerald Isle

Parks

Back Bay National Wildlife Refuge
Cape Hatteras National Seashore
Cape Lookout National Seashore
Currituck Heritage Park
Currituck National Wildlife Refuge
False Cape State Park
Fort Macon State Park
Fort Raleigh National Historic Site
Jockey's Ridge State Park
Mackay Island National Wildlife Refuge
Pea Island National Wildlife Refuge
Wright Brothers National Memorial

Notable residents
George Ackles (born 1967), professional basketball player
Dennis Anderson (born 1960), professional Monster Truck driver and creator of Grave Digger
Marc Basnight (1947–2020), former member of the North Carolina State Senate
Emanuel Davis (born 1989), Canadian Football League defensive back
Andy Griffith (1926–2012), actor
Cathy Johnston-Forbes (born 1963), professional golfer
Alexis Knapp (born 1989), actress
William Ivey Long (born 1947), costume designer for stage and film
Edward Teach (1680–1718), notorious English pirate better known as "Blackbeard," raided on the North Atlantic and Caribbean Sea
Manteo (disappeared after 1587) influential figure in the Croatoan Nation, ambassador to England and mediator
Wanchese (disappeared after 1587) influential figure in the Roanoke Nation, opposed English colonization

See also
Crystal Coast (Southern Outer Banks)
Hazard mitigation in the Outer Banks
Historic Albemarle Tour
Inner Banks
North Carolina Highway 12
Outer Banks Daredevils

References

External links

Outer Banks Visitors Bureau Dare county
College of The Albemarle

 
Barrier islands of North Carolina
Beaches of Dare County, North Carolina
Beaches of North Carolina
Islands of Carteret County, North Carolina
Landforms of Currituck County, North Carolina
Landforms of Hyde County, North Carolina
Wright brothers